Clanculus atricatena, common name the black-chained topshell, is a species of sea snail, a marine gastropod mollusk in the family Trochidae, the top snails.

Description
The size of an adult shell varies between 15 mm and 20 mm. The umbilical shell has a broadly conical shape. The body whorl is rounded at its periphery. The umbilicus is wide and is bordered by a callus ridge with small nodules.

Distribution
This marine species is found off the coast of Transkei, South Africa.

References

 Kilburn, R.N. & Rippey, E. (1982) Sea Shells of Southern Africa. Macmillan South Africa, Johannesburg, xi + 249 pp. page(s): 40
 Herbert G.G. (1993). Revision of the Trochinae, tribe Trochini (Gastropoda: Trochidae) of southern Africa. Annals of the Natal Museum 34(2):239–308
 Branch, G.M. et al. (2002). Two Oceans. 5th impression. David Philip, Cate Town & Johannesburg

External links

 

Endemic fauna of South Africa
atricatena
Gastropods described in 1921